Mayfield was a railway station on the now closed Eridge to Polegate cross country line (the Cuckoo Line). It was built by London, Brighton and South Coast Railway and closed under the Beeching Axe in 1965.
The station building is now a private residence. The trackbed and platforms have been removed and their site is now the occupied by the Mayfield by-pass (A267).

See also 
 List of closed railway stations in Britain

References

External links 
 Mayfield railway station on Subterranea Britannica.

 

Disused railway stations in East Sussex
Former London, Brighton and South Coast Railway stations
Railway stations in Great Britain opened in 1880
Railway stations in Great Britain closed in 1965
Beeching closures in England
Thomas Myres buildings
1880 establishments in England
1965 disestablishments in England
railway station